Ashley Fisher and Stephen Huss were the defending champions but decided not to participate.
Johan Brunström and Izak van der Merwe won the title, defeating Martin Emmrich and Andreas Siljeström 6–4, 6–1 in the final.

Seeds

Draw

Draw

References
 Main Draw

Sarasota Open - Doubles
2012 Doubles